Pushing the World Away is the Grammy-nominated, critically acclaimed fourteenth studio album by Kenny Garrett, released on September 17, 2013 on Mack Avenue Records. Following its release, the album peaked at number 6 on the Billboard Top Jazz Albums chart, which is the highest Billboard chart position for Garrett since African Exchange Student (1990) and Black Hope (1992). Featured musicians include keyboardists Vernell Brown and Benito Gonzalez, percussionist Rudy Bird, bassist Corcoran Holt and drummers Marcus Baylor and McClenty Hunter.

Track listing

Personnel 
Musicians
Kenny Garrett – alto saxophone (tracks 1-7, 9, 11, 12), soprano saxophone (track 8), chant (track 8), piano (track 10), arranger
Donald Brown – arranger (track 9)
Benito Gonzalez – piano (tracks 1-3, 5-7, 9, 12)
Corcoran Holt - bass
Marcus Baylor - drums (tracks 1-3, 5, 6, 9, 12)
Rudy Bird - percussion (tracks 3, 5-7, 9), cymbals and gong (track 8)
Ravi Best - trumpet (track 3)
Vernell Brown - piano (tracks 4, 8, 11, 12), chant (track 8)
McClenty Hunter - drums (tracks 4, 7, 10, 12), vocals (track 6)
Mark Whitfield, Jr. - drums (tracks 8, 11, 12)
Jean Baylor - vocals (track 9)
Carolin Pook - violin (track 10)
Brian Sanders - cello (track 10)
Jen Herman - viola (track 10)
Misha Tarasov - string arrangement (track 10)

Production
Kenny Garrett – producer
Donald Brown – producer
Gretchen C. Valade – executive producer
Al Pryor – Executive VP of A&R
Joe Ferla – recording, mixing engineer
Bob Mallory – assistant engineer
Fred Sladkey – assistant engineer
Greg Calbi – mastering engineer
Will Wakefield – production manager
Randall Kennedy – creative director
Maria Ehrenreich – creative services, production
Michael Snyder – art direction, design
Keith Major - photography

Awards and nominations

Chart positions

References 

Mack Avenue Records albums
Kenny Garrett albums
2013 albums